Banu Jadhimah was one of the Arabian tribes that interacted with Muhammad. It was "of Ta'if" and it is a branch of Banu Kinanah which is the mother tribe of Quraysh, the tribe of Mohammed

History
They were a branch of the Kinana tribe, descendants of Jadhima ibn Amir ibn Abd Manat ibn Kinana.

Some men from the Banu Jadhimah had killed al-Fakih ibn al-Mughirah al-Makhzumi, uncle of Khalid ibn al-Walid, and Awf ibn Abd Awf, father of Abd al-Rahman ibn Awf, before the conquest of Mecca in 630. When Khalid led an expedition against the Banu Jadhimah, he persuaded them to disarm by acknowledging that they had become Muslims, and then killed some of them.  When Muhammad heard of this, he declared to God that he was innocent of what Khalid had done, and sent Ali ibn Abi Talib to pay the survivors compensation to the tribe.

References

Semitic-speaking peoples
Kinana
Arabian tribes that interacted with Muhammad
Bedouin groups
History of the Arabian Peninsula
Bedouins in Saudi Arabia